The 1986 Pacific typhoon season has no official bounds; it ran year-round in 1986, but most tropical cyclones tend to form in the northwestern Pacific Ocean between May and December. These dates conventionally delimit the period of each year when most tropical cyclones form in the northwestern Pacific Ocean. Tropical Storms formed in the entire west pacific basin were assigned a name by the Joint Typhoon Warning Center. Tropical depressions that enter or form in the Philippine area of responsibility are assigned a name by the Philippine Atmospheric, Geophysical and Astronomical Services Administration or PAGASA. This can often result in the same storm having two names.

A total of 32 tropical depressions formed in 1986 in the Western Pacific over an eleven-month time span. Of the 32, 30 became tropical storms, 19 storms reached typhoon intensity, and 3 reached super typhoon strength. The Joint Typhoon Warning Center considered Vera as two tropical cyclones, when all the warning centers treated Vera as one in real time, while another, Georgette, originated in the Eastern Pacific. Six of the tropical cyclones formed in August, which was the busiest month of the season. Eight tropical cyclones moved through the Philippines this season. Most of the deaths attributed to typhons in 1986 were caused by Peggy and Wayne.

Seasonal summary 

Of the thirty tropical storms formed in 1986 in the Western Pacific (from 32 tropical depressions), 19 reached typhoon intensity, and three reached super typhoon strength. Broken down by month, one tropical cyclone formed in February, one in April, two in May, three in June, three in July, seven in August, three in September, four in October, six in November, and two forming in December. Vera was considered two tropical cyclones by the Joint Typhoon Warning Center after the fact, though it was operationally treated as one system, and Georgette, was a former Eastern Pacific cyclone. Eight tropical cyclones moved through the Philippines this season, while three struck mainland China, one struck Korea, and one crossed the Japanese coast. Peggy and Wayne accounted for a majority of the death toll this season. Tropical cyclones accounted for 35 percent of the annual rainfall in Hong Kong this year.

Systems

Typhoon Judy (Akang) 

The initial disturbance formed within two degrees of the equator within the monsoon trough on January 25. Over succeeding days, the thunderstorm area increased in size. However, it decreased significantly on January 30. As the convective area moved slowly westward, it increased in coverage once more, organizing into a tropical depression on February 1. Moving on a parabolic course east of the Philippines, Judy gained tropical storm status on February 2, and typhoon strength on February 4 after recurving to the northwest of the subtropical ridge. As westerly winds increased aloft, vertical wind shear weakened Judy back into a tropical storm, which lost tropical characteristics on February 6. After drifting slightly more east-northeastward, the low-pressure area dissipated.

Typhoon Ken (Bising) 

A tropical disturbance formed along the near equatorial trough on April 20 well to the south of Guam. The system slowly increased in organization, becoming a tropical depression on April 26. The system quickly developed thereafter, becoming a typhoon on April 27 while moving northward. The system reached its peak intensity on April 28. The subtropical ridge built to its northwest, steering Ken to the west. South-westerly vertical wind shear led to a weakening trend to begin on April 29. On April 30, Ken's low level circulation was exposed, no longer having any thunderstorms near the center. The remnant low drifted westward, dissipating by May 3. It was also formed after Chernobyl Disaster.

Super Typhoon Lola 

Forming as a twin cyclone with South Pacific's Cyclone Namu, the initial disturbance of Lola developed within the monsoon trough south of Guam. Moving eastward, the system slowly developed becoming a tropical depression, then a tropical storm, on May 17. Lola moved over Pohnpei, becoming their most destructive cyclone since 1958. In light of the damage caused by the storm, the island was declared a major disaster area on June 3 by the American government. Continuing to intensify, Lola became a typhoon on May 18 and turned northwest. Rapid intensification continued, with Lola becoming a super typhoon on May 19. Peaking in intensity on May 20, Lola recurved to the north and northeast, weakening into a tropical storm on May 23 and evolving into an extratropical cyclone later that day.

Tropical Storm Mac (Klaring) 

This system moved generally to the east-northeast throughout its life cycle. Forming near Hainan Island on May 21 as a monsoon depression, the initial tropical disturbance moved through the South China Sea while slowly organizing. Becoming a tropical depression in the Formosa Strait, Mac quickly became a tropical storm and turned northeast, paralleling the coast of Taiwan. On May 27, Mac turned back towards the east-northeast as upper level westerly winds increased, causing vertical wind shear which led to Mac weakening into a tropical depression before dissipating on May 29.

Typhoon Nancy (Deling) 

A broad area of convection formed to the southeast of Pohnpei in mid June. The convection formed a tropical depression on June 21 to the east of the Philippines. Tropical Storm Nancy was named the next and quickly strengthened into a typhoon with max winds of  before striking northeastern Taiwan. After departing the island Nancy weakened to tropical storm strength while moving north through the East China Sea. Nancy passed through the Korea Straits just before turning extratropical and accelerating northeastward into the Sea of Japan.

Tropical Storm Owen (Emang) 

Forming as a tropical disturbance southwest of Kosrae on June 21. Moving west-northwest, the system gradually became better organized. On June 28, the disturbance had organized into a tropical depression. Recurving east of the Philippines and Taiwan, Owen developed into a tropical storm, reaching its maximum intensity on June 29. Thereafter, east-northeasterly winds aloft led to vertical wind shear which weakened Owen. While moving north-northeast towards southern Japan, the system devolved into a low level circulation devoid of thunderstorms, and dissipated on July 2.

Super Typhoon Peggy (Gading) 

Typhoon Peggy, which developed on July 3 east of the Philippines, steadily strengthened to reach a peak of  super typhoon on July 7. As Peggy continued westward, it slowly weakened, and hit northeastern Luzon on July 9 as a  typhoon. A slight weakening of the subtropical ridge brought Peggy more northward, where it hit southeastern China as a  tropical storm on the July 11. Peggy's fury resulted in 333 casualties and US$2.5 million (1986 dollars) in damage from torrential flooding.

Typhoon Roger (Heling) 

An upper-level low retrograded westward across the tropical Pacific Ocean beginning on July 4. On July 8, a tropical disturbance formed southeast of the upper low southwest of Enewetak Atoll. The system moved westward, slowly organizing. Becoming a tropical depression on July 13, the small system turned northwest, recurving gradually around a subtropical ridge to its east and northeast. The system strengthened into a tropical storm later on July 13, and a typhoon on July 14 to the south of Japan. After turning to the northeast, the system began to experience northeasterly vertical wind shear and began to weaken. After passing east of Okinawa, the system began to transition into an extratropical cyclone, a process which completed on July 17 near the southern coast of Japan.

Tropical Storm Nine 

Forming on the South China Sea on July 19, the cyclone moved northwest into mainland China on July 22, maintaining its circulation as it turned westward before dissipating on July 24. This system was recognized by the Japanese Meteorological Agency as a tropical storm.

Severe Tropical Storm Sarah (Iliang) 

Developing in the Philippine Sea on July 30, the system developed as it moved westward, becoming a tropical storm on July 31. On August 1, its mid-level circulation center crossed into the South China Sea while its surface circulation was left behind east of the Philippines. Sarah's broad circulation center was difficult to locate until it began moving northeast east of Luzon on August 2, when it intensified to its peak intensity. As Sarah moved east of Honshu, it evolved into an extratropical cyclone. Fourteen died in Japan due to Sarah.

Severe Tropical Storm Georgette 

From August 3 to August 4, Tropical Storm Georgette existed in the Eastern Pacific, but degraded into a tropical wave while moving rapidly westward. Five days later in the Western Pacific, Georgette regenerated into a tropical storm, and became a typhoon on August 10. At this time, a tropical disturbance was developing to its west, and it became Tropical Storm Tip on the 11th. Tip and Georgette underwent fujiwhara interaction, causing smaller Georgette to loop as the larger storm Tip headed to the north. Georgette weakened to a tropical depression on August 15, and was absorbed by Tip's large inflow band on August 16.

CMA Tropical Storm Fifteen 

This system formed in the South China Sea on August 9, and moved northwest through Hainan Island into mainland China, dissipating on August 12. Extensive flooding occurred on Hainan and western Guangdong Province, killing two people. The Hong Kong Royal Observatory considered this system a tropical depression.

Typhoon Tip 

Georgette became a typhoon on August 10 to the east of a tropical disturbance, which developed into Tropical Storm Tip on August 11. Tip and Georgette underwent the Fujiwhara effect, causing smaller Georgette to loop as the larger storm Tip headed to the north. Georgette became absorbed by Tip's large inflow band on August 16. Tip strengthened to a typhoon, and reached a peak intensity of  winds before vertical wind shear caused the system to weaken. On August 19, Tip became extratropical, but the system persisted as a remnant extratropical low for six more days.

Typhoon Vera (Loleng) 

The most intense and extensive monsoon trough since 1974 spawned a tropical depression on August 15. It drifted to the southeast, relocating several times in its formative stages. On August 16 it was upgraded to Tropical Storm Vera, and operationally the storm was to continue eastward, continuing to relocate in the broad monsoon trough and becoming a storm again on August 17 after weakening. Post-analysis by the Joint Typhoon Warning Center suggested that the first storm turned to the west and dissipated, and that a new, separate storm formed well to the east on August 17. However, the Japan Meteorological Agency maintained the system as a single storm.

Vera drifted northward until an upper-level ridge forced the storm to the east, providing upper-level outflow for Vera to strengthen to a typhoon on August 20. On August 22, Vera attained winds of  before the weakening ridge forced the typhoon to the west, retracing its path it took days before. The typhoon slowly weakened, and hit Okinawa on August 25 as a  typhoon. Vera turned to the northeast, hit South Korea on August 28 as a minimal typhoon, and became extratropical on August 29 in the Sea of Japan. A total of 23 people were killed from the storm, with moderate to heavy damage in its path as far north as the Soviet Far East. Damage totalled US$22 million (1986 dollars) across South Korea.

Typhoon Wayne (Miding) 

One of the longest lasting Western Pacific system on record began its long life on August 16 in the South China Sea, having formed from the monsoon trough. It drifted to the southwest, then looped back to the northwest, becoming a tropical storm on August 18. Wayne turned to the northeast and became a typhoon on August 19. The typhoon passed offshore of southeastern China and hit western Taiwan on August 22. Wayne turned back to the south and southwest. Vertical shear caused Wayne to weaken to a depression on August 25. Wayne turned back to the northeast, rotating around Vera. Once Vera accelerated away, Wayne drifted northeastward through the South China Sea, becoming a tropical storm on August 27.

Wayne turned southward, becoming a typhoon again on August 30. Wayne passed close to northern Luzon on September 2 before turning back to the west. Two days later while moving quickly westward through the South China Sea, Wayne reached a peak of  winds. The cyclone hit northern Hainan on September 5, entered the Gulf of Tonkin, and made its final landfall on northern Vietnam later that day as a  tropical storm. The next day, Wayne dissipated over Vietnam, after 85 advisories and being the longest lasting Western Pacific system in history. Wayne brought torrential rains through its path to the Philippines, Taiwan, southeastern China, Hainan Island, and Vietnam. Because of this, 490 fatalities (most in Vietnam), tens of thousands left homeless, and US$399 million (1986 dollars) in damage can be attributed to Typhoon Wayne.

Tropical Storm Fifteen 

Originating in the subtropical west-central Pacific, this large cyclone moved westward to a point south of Japan before becoming a tropical storm. Soon afterward, the system recurved across central Japan on September 2 and evolved into an extratropical cyclone as it returned to the northern Pacific Ocean on September 3. This system was recognized by the Japanese Meteorological Agency as a tropical storm, and the Hong Kong Royal Observatory as a tropical depression.

Typhoon Abby (Norming) 

Typhoon Abby developed from an area of persistent convection to the southwest of Truk in early August. A tropical depression formed on August 13 to the southeast of Guam and was upgraded to a tropical storm a day after passing south of the island. Abby then steadily intensified to a peak of  but weakened before striking Taiwan. Flooding on Taiwan killed 13 people, and agricultural damage totalled $81 million (1986 USD, $173 million 2013 USD). After departing Taiwan Abby continued north-northeast before dissipating in the East China Sea.

Typhoon Ben 

The initial tropical disturbance formed near Majuro on September 15. The system moved west-northwest, becoming a tropical depression on September 18 and a tropical storm on September 19. Thirteen perished on a fishing vessel passing by Pagan as Ben passed nearby. Ben turned north-northwest for a day and a half, moving around an upper level cyclone in its vicinity, before resuming a west-northwest track on September 20. Vertical wind shear, caused by strong north-northeast winds aloft, weakened Ben to minimal tropical storm intensity by September 21. Ben entered a more favourable environment, achieving typhoon intensity on September 23 before rounding the southwest portion of the subtropical ridge. Ben recurved to the northeast on September 26, moving well to the east of Japan, as vertical wind shear increased due to strengthening winds aloft from the southwest. Ben subsequently weakened back into a tropical storm on September 30 before transitioning into an extratropical cyclone later that day.

Typhoon Carmen 

The initial tropical disturbance was first noted to the east-southeast of Majuro on September 27. The system tracked north of due west, before consolidating slowly into a tropical depression on September 30 and a tropical storm on October 2. After passing between Rota and Saipan, Carmen turned northwest and intensified into a typhoon on October 4. Moving through a break in the subtropical ridge, Carmen rapidly strengthened as it turned north, then northeast, on October 6 when maximum sustained winds reached . As vertical wind shear increased due to strengthening southwest winds aloft, the cyclone weakened into a tropical storm on October 8, evolving into an extratropical cyclone by October 9.

Tropical Storm Dom (Oyang) 

Initially noted as a tropical disturbance in the Philippine Sea on October 2, the system moved slowly west-northwest to the south of the subtropical ridge, becoming a tropical depression on October 4. Crossing the Philippines, the depression caused heavy rainfall and flooding as it emerged into the South China Sea and developed into a tropical storm on October 9. Development was slow due to strong upper-level winds from the northeast displacing thunderstorms west-southwest of its center. Continuing to track north of due west, Dom made landfall in Vietnam and dissipated as it moved along the Laos/Vietnam border on October 12. A total of 16 perished and damage totalled US$4 million (1986 dollars) in Luzon.

Typhoon Ellen (Pasing) 

The initial tropical disturbance formed just west of the International Date Line within the monsoon trough on October 3. The system moved westward for nearly a week without significant development. Becoming a tropical depression on October 9 and a tropical storm on October 11, the cyclone turned to the west-northwest, moving through the central Philippines into the South China Sea. Turning more northerly, Ellen intensified to a typhoon while paralleling the west coast of Luzon on October 14. By October 15, Ellen's track became increasingly more westerly due to a building surface high pressure area to its north. Weakening began due to westerly winds aloft and land interaction with China, and Ellen dropped back to tropical storm strength on October 17. The cyclone moved south of Hong Kong and north of Hainan Island into mainland China on October 19. As it neared the border between Vietnam and China, Ellen dissipated on October 20.

Typhoon Forrest 

The initial tropical disturbance formed near the International Date Line on October 10 before moving on a parabolic track well east of Asia. A small system, it moved west-northwest and organized into a tropical depression on October 15, then a tropical storm later in the day. Late on October 16, Forrest intensified into a typhoon. Forrest then recurved south-southeast of Iwo Jima. As winds aloft increased out of the west, Forrest slowly weakened, becoming a tropical storm once more on October 20 and evolving into an extratropical cyclone by October 21.

Tropical Storm Georgia (Ruping) 

First noted as a tropical disturbance east of Ulithi within the monsoon trough on October 14, the system moved north of due west. Slowly developing, the system evolved into a tropical depression on October 17 and tropical storm on October 18. The cyclone reached its peak intensity before it crossed the central Philippines on October 19 and emerged into the South China Sea. On October 22, Georgia made landfall across Vietnam and crossed Laos into Thailand. The system subsequently dissipated by October 23.

Tropical Depression Susang

Severe Tropical Storm Herbert (Tering) 

Forming as a tropical disturbance near the International Date Line on October 29, the system moved westward at low latitude eventually organizing into a tropical depression on November 3 south of Guam. The system moved north of due west across the central Philippines and emerged into the South China Sea before strengthening into a tropical storm on November 9. Herbert moved westward, making landfall in Vietnam on November 11 before dissipating in Laos on November 12.

Severe Tropical Storm Ida (Uding) 

Initially a tropical disturbance between Kosrae and Enewetak on November 6, the system moved south of west until November 9, when the system began tracking north of west. The system organized into a tropical depression on November 10, then tropical storm on November 11, while moving towards the Philippines. Six days after Herbert, Ida crossed the central portion of the archipelago between November 12 and 13. Interaction with the islands weakened the system back into a tropical depression before emerging into the South China Sea. Strengthening back into a tropical storm on November 14, Ida transcribed an anticyclonic, or clockwise, loop, weakening back into a tropical depression on November 16 while moving to the south due to strong southwest winds aloft. The depression moved south-southwest before dissipating on November 19. Two died when a cargo ship sank near Dongsha.

Typhoon Joe (Weling) 

The initial tropical disturbance formed on November 12 south of Guam. Moving west-northwest, the system organized into a tropical depression in the Philippine Sea on November 17, and then a tropical storm on November 20. Joe recurved just east of the Philippines due to a weakness in the subtropical ridge, strengthening into a typhoon on November 20. East of Taiwan, Joe weakened back into a tropical storm due to strong southwest winds aloft on November 23 and then a tropical depression on November 24. Turning southeast, the remaining low level circulation continued weakening, dissipating on November 25.

Tropical Depression 

A tropical depression formed in the southern South China Sea on November 24, dissipating the following day without making landfall on any neighbouring land mass. This depression was acknowledged by the Hong Kong Royal Observatory in their year end summary.

Super Typhoon Kim (Yaning) 

The initial tropical disturbance formed south of Majuro on November 27. The small system developed quickly, becoming a tropical depression later that day, a tropical storm on November 28, and a typhoon on November 29. Kim turned northwest later the day due to a weakness in the subtropical ridge, before a strengthening high pressure system to its north forced a more westerly track by December 2, with Kim becoming a super typhoon soon afterward. The cyclone moved just north of Saipan, knocking out all electricity and water. Damage on the island totalled US$15 million (1986 dollars). Retaining super typhoon intensity into December 3, the system weakened and turned northwest on December 4 due to another weakness in the subtropical ridge. The high pressure system to its north restrengthened, turning Kim back to the west on December 5. On December 8, Kim made a cyclonic, or counter clockwise, loop due to a strong surface high building to its north, which was completed on December 11. During the loop, Kim weakened back into a tropical storm, with tropical depression status regained by December 12 as Kim moved northwest. The system recurved east of Taiwan, dissipating by December 14.

Severe Tropical Storm Lex 

The initial tropical disturbance formed on November 30 in the wake of Kim near the International Date Line. The system moved west-northwest, developing into a tropical depression and tropical storm on December 4. Lex remained a tropical storm for one day, before weakening back into a tropical disturbance on December 5 due to vertical wind shear caused by Typhoon Kim and an upper trough nearby from the northwest. The depression passed between Guam and Saipan on December 7. Lex recurved south of Iwo Jima on December 8 before becoming an extratropical cyclone on December 9.

Typhoon Marge (Aning) 

A long tracked system, the initial tropical disturbance which led to Marge was noted near the International Date Line on December 10. Moving north of due west the disturbance was slow to organize, becoming a tropical depression on December 14 southwest of Enewetak. The system strengthened into a tropical storm on December 15, and a typhoon by December 17. Early on December 20, Marge peaked in intensity before turning south of due west due to a strong surface high to its north. On December 21, Marge moved into the southern Philippines which accelerated its weakening trend. On December 22, Marge regained tropical storm status and soon after moving into the South China Sea, the cyclone weakened into a tropical depression late on December 23. The depression moved westward for another day before dissipating on December 24. Marge's circulation aided the global journey of the Rutan Voyager aircraft, which went on to circle the Earth on one tank of fuel.

Typhoon Norris (Bidang) 

The initial tropical disturbance formed near the International Date Line on December 17, and initially moved west-northwest. The system slowly organized, becoming a tropical depression December 21, and then a tropical storm on December 23 as it turned more to the west due to a strengthening ridge of high pressure to its north. The cyclone steadily strengthened over the next four days, initially hampered by strong east winds aloft. Norris became a typhoon on December 27. Over the next day and half, intensification continued. On December 28, a strong surface high pressure system turned Norris to the southwest, and led to slow weakening. The cyclone regained tropical storm strength on December 30 while turning more to the west. Norris crossed the southern Philippines on December 31 and January 1, weakening into a tropical depression as it emerged into the South China Sea. Strong southeast winds aloft prevented redevelopment of the depression. Norris' remnant circulation turned northwest and dissipated on January 2 well to the south of Hong Kong.

Storm names 

During the season 26 named tropical cyclones developed in the Western Pacific and were named by the Joint Typhoon Warning Center, when it was determined that they had become tropical storms. These names were contributed to a revised list which started on 1979.

Philippines 

The Philippine Atmospheric, Geophysical and Astronomical Services Administration uses its own naming scheme for tropical cyclones in their area of responsibility. PAGASA assigns names to tropical depressions that form within their area of responsibility and any tropical cyclone that might move into their area of responsibility. Should the list of names for a given year prove to be insufficient, names are taken from an auxiliary list, the first 6 of which are published each year before the season starts. Names not retired from this list will be used again in the 1990 season. This is the same list used for the 1982 season. PAGASA uses its own naming scheme that starts in the Filipino alphabet, with names of Filipino female names ending with "ng" (A, B, K, D, etc.).

Season effects 
This is a table of all of the storms that have formed in the 1986 Pacific typhoon season. It includes their duration, names, affected areas, damages, and death totals. Deaths in parentheses are additional and indirect (an example of an indirect death would be a traffic accident), but were still related to that storm. Damage and deaths include totals while the storm was extratropical, a wave, or a low, and all of the damage figures are in 1986 USD. Names listed in parentheses were assigned by PAGASA.

|-
| Judy (Akang) ||  || bgcolor=#| || bgcolor=#| || bgcolor=#| || Caroline Islands || None || None ||
|-
| TD ||  || bgcolor=#| || bgcolor=#| || bgcolor=#| || Philippines || None || None ||
|-
| Ken (Bising) ||  || bgcolor=#| || bgcolor=#| || bgcolor=#| || Caroline Islands || None || None ||
|-
| TD ||  || bgcolor=#| || bgcolor=#| || bgcolor=#| || Thailand, Cambodia || None || None ||
|-
| Lola ||  || bgcolor=#| || bgcolor=#| || bgcolor=#| || Caroline Islands || None || None ||
|-
| Mac (Klaring) ||  || bgcolor=#| || bgcolor=#| || bgcolor=#| || Vietnam, South China, Philippines, Taiwan, Ryukyu Islands ||  None || None ||
|-
| TD ||  || bgcolor=#| || bgcolor=#| || bgcolor=#| || None || None || None ||
|-
| Nancy (Deling) ||  || bgcolor=#| || bgcolor=#| || bgcolor=#| || Philippines, East China, Taiwan, Ryukyu Islands, South Korea || None ||  ||
|-
| TD ||  || bgcolor=#| || bgcolor=#| || bgcolor=#| || South China || None || None ||
|-
| Owen (Emang) ||  || bgcolor=#| || bgcolor=#| || bgcolor=#| || Ryukyu Islands ||  None || None ||
|-
| Peggy (Gading) ||  || bgcolor=#| || bgcolor=#| || bgcolor=#| || Mariana Islands, Philippines, Taiwan, China ||  ||  ||
|-
| Roger (Heling) ||  || bgcolor=#| || bgcolor=#| || bgcolor=#| || Japan || None || None ||
|-
| Nine ||  || bgcolor=#| || bgcolor=#| || bgcolor=#| || South China ||  None || None ||
|-
| TD ||  || bgcolor=#| || bgcolor=#| || bgcolor=#| || Taiwan || None || None ||
|-
| Sarah (Iliang) ||  || bgcolor=#| || bgcolor=#| || bgcolor=#| || Philippines, Japan || None || None ||
|-
| TD ||  || bgcolor=#| || bgcolor=#| || bgcolor=#| || None || None || None ||
|-
| TD ||  || bgcolor=#| || bgcolor=#| || bgcolor=#| || Taiwan || None || None ||
|-
| TD ||  || bgcolor=#| || bgcolor=#| || bgcolor=#| || Marshall Islands || None || None ||
|-
| Georgette ||  || bgcolor=#| || bgcolor=#| || bgcolor=#| || Marshall Islands || None || None ||
|-
| TD ||  || bgcolor=#| || bgcolor=#| || bgcolor=#| || Vietnam, South China || None ||  ||
|-
| TD ||  || bgcolor=#| || bgcolor=#| || bgcolor=#| || South China|| None || None ||
|-
| Tip ||  || bgcolor=#| || bgcolor=#| || bgcolor=#| || None || None || None ||
|-
| Vera (Loleng) ||  || bgcolor=#| || bgcolor=#| || bgcolor=#| || Mariana Islands, Taiwan, East China, Japan, Korean Peninsula ||  ||  ||
|-
| Wayne (Miding) ||  || bgcolor=#| || bgcolor=#| || bgcolor=#| || Philippines, Taiwan, China, Vietnam, Laos, Thailand ||  ||  ||
|-
| TD ||  || bgcolor=#| || bgcolor=#| || bgcolor=#| || None || None || None ||
|-
| TD ||  || bgcolor=#| || bgcolor=#| || bgcolor=#| || None || None || None ||
|-
| TD ||  || bgcolor=#| || bgcolor=#| || bgcolor=#| || Wake Island || None || None ||
|-
| Fifteen ||  || bgcolor=#| || bgcolor=#| || bgcolor=#| || Japan ||  None || None ||
|-
| TD ||  || bgcolor=#| || bgcolor=#| || bgcolor=#| || Mariana Islands || None || None ||
|-
| TD ||  || bgcolor=#| || bgcolor=#| || bgcolor=#| || None || None || None ||
|-
| Abby (Norming) ||  || bgcolor=#| || bgcolor=#| || bgcolor=#| || Caroline Islands, Mariana Islands, Philippines, Taiwan, East China ||  ||  ||
|-
| Ben ||  || bgcolor=#| || bgcolor=#| || bgcolor=#| || Mariana Islands || None || None ||
|-
| Carmen ||  || bgcolor=#| || bgcolor=#| || bgcolor=#| || Caroline Islands, Mariana Islands || None || None ||
|-
| Dom (Oyang) ||  || bgcolor=#| || bgcolor=#| || bgcolor=#| || Philippines, Vietnam ||  ||  ||
|-
| TD ||  || bgcolor=#| || bgcolor=#| || bgcolor=#| || Philippines || None || None ||
|-
| Ellen (Pasing) ||  || bgcolor=#| || bgcolor=#| || bgcolor=#| || Philippines, South China || None || None ||
|-
| Forrest ||  || bgcolor=#| || bgcolor=#| || bgcolor=#| || Marshall Islands, Mariana Islands || None || None ||
|-
| Georgia (Ruping) ||  || bgcolor=#| || bgcolor=#| || bgcolor=#| || Philippines, Vietnam, Laos || None || None ||
|-
| Susang ||  || bgcolor=#| || bgcolor=#| || bgcolor=#| || Philippines || None || None ||
|-
| Herbert (Tering) ||  || bgcolor=#| || bgcolor=#| || bgcolor=#| || Philippines, Vietnam || None || None ||
|-
| Ida (Uding) ||  || bgcolor=#| || bgcolor=#| || bgcolor=#| || Philippines || None || None ||
|-
| Joe (Weling) ||  || bgcolor=#| || bgcolor=#| || bgcolor=#| || Philippines || None || None ||
|-
| TD ||  || bgcolor=#| || bgcolor=#| || bgcolor=#| || None || None || None ||
|-
| Kim (Yaning) ||  || bgcolor=#| || bgcolor=#| || bgcolor=#| || Philippines || None || None ||
|-
| TD ||  || bgcolor=#| || bgcolor=#| || bgcolor=#| || Vietnam|| None || None ||
|-
| Lex ||  || bgcolor=#| || bgcolor=#| || bgcolor=#| || Marshall Islands, Caroline Islands, Mariana Islands || None || None ||
|-
| Marge (Aning) ||  || bgcolor=#| || bgcolor=#| || bgcolor=#| || Caroline Islands, Mariana Islands, Philippines || None || None ||
|-
| Norris (Bidang) ||  || bgcolor=#| || bgcolor=#| || bgcolor=#| || Caroline Islands, Mariana Islands, Philippines || None || None ||
|-

See also 

 List of Pacific typhoon seasons
 1986 Pacific hurricane season
 1986 Atlantic hurricane season
 1986 North Indian Ocean cyclone season
 Australian cyclone seasons: 1985–86, 1986–87
 South Pacific cyclone seasons: 1985–86, 1986–87
 South-West Indian Ocean cyclone seasons: 1985–86, 1986–87

References

External links 
 Japan Meteorological Agency
 Joint Typhoon Warning Center .
 China Meteorological Agency
 National Weather Service Guam
 Hong Kong Observatory
 Macau Meteorological Geophysical Services
 Philippine Atmospheric, Geophysical and Astronomical Services Administration
 Taiwan Central Weather Bureau
 Satellite movie of 1986 Pacific typhoon season

 
Articles which contain graphical timelines
1986 WPAC